Cephalophysis is a lichen genus in the family Teloschistaceae. It is a monotypic genus, containing the single species Cephalophysis leucospila.

References

Teloschistales
Lichen genera
Teloschistales genera
Taxa described in 1967
Taxa named by Hannes Hertel